Kozluk is a district of Batman Province, Turkey.

Kozluk can also refer to:
 Kozluk, Zvornik, a village in Zvornik Municipality, Bosnia and Herzegovina
Kozluk, Bayburt, a village in the Bayburt District, Bayburt Province, Turkey
 Kozluk, Düzce, a village in Düzce District, Düzce Province, Turkey
 Kozluk, Elâzığ,  a village in Elazığ District, Elazığ Province, Turkey

People with the name
Rob Kozluk (born 1977), English footballer